The Irish League in season 1997–98 comprised two divisions, one of 10 teams and one of 8 teams, and Cliftonville won the championship.

Premier Division

League standings

Results

Matches 1–18

Matches 19–36

First Division

League standings

References
Northern Ireland - List of final tables (RSSSF)

NIFL Premiership seasons
1
Northern